"Unity" is the second single from American rock band Shinedown's fourth studio album, Amaryllis.

Release
The song was released on March 13, 2012.

Music video
On the same day as the release of the official single, the official video premiered on the band's YouTube channel. The video follows a girl taking pictures of people across town. At the end of the song, the pictures resemble two hands, each of a different color.

Charts

Weekly charts

Year-end charts

References

External links

2012 singles
Shinedown songs
Hard rock ballads
2012 songs
Songs written by Brent Smith
Songs written by Dave Bassett (songwriter)
Atlantic Records singles
Song recordings produced by Rob Cavallo
Songs written by Eric Bass